is a Christian university in Tokyo and Yokohama that was established in 1863. The Reverend Dr. James Curtis Hepburn was one of its founders and served as the first president. The novelist and poet Shimazaki Toson graduated from this college and wrote the lyrics of its college song.

List of undergraduate schools and departments 
 Faculty of Literature
 Department of English Literature
 Department of French literature
 Department of Art
 Faculty of Economics
 Department of Economics
 Department of Business Administration
 Faculty of Sociology and Social Work
 Department of Sociology
 Department of Social Work
 Faculty of Law
 Department of Jurisprudence
 Department of Political Science
 Department of Current Legal Studies
 Department of Global Legal Studies
 Faculty of International Studies
 Department of International Studies
 Department of Global and Transcultural Studies
 Faculty of Psychology
 Department of Psychology
 Department of Education and Child Development

List of graduate schools 
 Graduate School of Literature
 Graduate School of Economics
 Graduate School of Sociology and Social Work
 Graduate School of International Studies
 Graduate School of Psychology
 Graduate Law School

List of research institutes 
 Institute of Christian Research
 International Peace Research Institute
 Institute of Language and Culture
 Research Institute of Industry and Economy
 Institute of Sociology and Social Work
 Law Research Institute
 Institute of the Faculty of International Studies
 Institute of Center for Liberal Art
 Institute of the Faculty of Psychology

List of affiliated schools 
 Meiji Gakuin High School
 Meiji Gakuin Higashi Murayama High School
 Meiji Gakuin Junior High School
 Tennessee Meiji Gakuin High School (former)

References

External links

Meiji Gakuin - official website

Educational institutions established in 1863
Private universities and colleges in Japan
Minato, Tokyo
Meiji Gakuin University
Universities and colleges in Yokohama
1863 establishments in Japan
Association of Christian Universities and Colleges in Asia
Christian universities and colleges in Japan